Sergiu Rădăuțanu (17 June 1926 – 6 March 1998) was a Moldovan physicist. He was a member of Moldovan Academy of Sciences and professor at the State Technical University in Chişinău (now named for him).

External links 
 www.radautan.info - Website "Sergiu Rădăuțan"

1926 births
1998 deaths
Moldovan physicists
Recipients of the Order of the Republic (Moldova)
20th-century Moldovan people